National Highway 105 (NH 105)  connects  Darbhanga and Jainagar in Bihar.

Route 
 Darbhanga
 Khirma
 Ladari
 paradih
 darima
 Keoti
Ranway
 Aunshi
 Rahika
 Pokharauni
 Kapsiya
 Loha
 Kaluahi
 Dullipatti
 Jainagar
It has been decided to construct the forelane road in the strategically sensitive border area due to neighbouring country Nepal.

See also
 List of National Highways in India (by Highway Number)
 List of National Highways in India
 National Highways Development Project

References

External links
  NH network map of India

105
National highways in India (old numbering)